Milton Area High School is a rural/suburban public high school located at 700 Mahoning Street, Milton, Northumberland County, Pennsylvania. It is the sole high school operated by the Milton Area School District. In 2013, the Milton Area High School reported an enrollment of 669 pupils in grades 9th through 12th. The High School employed 53 teachers. Per the Pennsylvania Department of Education 100% of the teachers were rated "Highly Qualified" under the federal No Child Left Behind Act. The total minority enrollment is 11 percent. The school is not a Title I school.

Milton School in Cambodia
Spearheaded by Michael Conn (a history teacher at Milton High School), the members of Team Cambodia, a group dedicated to raising money to build a school in the Kampong Cham province of Cambodia, and the majority of the student body raised over $30,000.  The school is completed and is now in service. Students and faculty members of the Milton School District recently completed a trip to Cambodia to check in and report back to the community on the success of the endeavor.

Extracurriculars
Milton Area School District offers a variety of clubs, activities and an extensive sports program.

Athletics
Milton High School participates in various sports through the Pennsylvania Interscholastic Athletic Association and is a member of the Pennsylvania Heartland Athletic Conference since 2008–2009 school year.

The district funds:

Boys
Baseball - AAA
Basketball - AAA
Bowling - AAAA
Cross country - AA
Football - AAA
Golf - AA
Soccer - AA
Tennis - AA
Track and field - AA
Wrestling - AA

Girls
Basketball - AA
Bowling - AAAA
Cheer - AAAA added 2014
Cross country - AA
Field hockey - AA
Golf - AA
Soccer - A
Softball - AA
Tennis - AA
Track and field - AA

According to PIAA directory July 2015

Alumni
Frances R. Jones, state legislator

References

Education in Union County, Pennsylvania
Schools in Northumberland County, Pennsylvania
Susquehanna Valley
Public high schools in Pennsylvania